Toptushka is a rural locality (a selo) and the administrative center of Toptushensky Selsoviet of Togulsky District, Altai Krai, Russia. The population was 186 in 2016. There are 6 streets.

Geography 
Toptushka is located 25 km southeast of Togul (the district's administrative centre) by road. Stary Togul is the nearest rural locality.

Ethnicity 
The village is inhabited by Russians.

References 

Rural localities in Togulsky District